The posterior cricoarytenoid muscles are small, paired intrinsic muscles of the larynx that extend between cricoid cartilage to the arytenoid cartilages in the larynx.

Structure

Origin and insertion 
The posterior cricoarytenoid originates from the posterior surface of the posterior quadrate lamina of the cricoid cartilage. It inserts onto the muscular process of the arytenoid cartilage. Its distinct medial and lateral bellies insert onto opposite surfaces of the muscular process.

Nerve supply 
The posterior cricoarytenoid muscles are supplied by the anterior division of the recurrent laryngeal nerve, a branch of the vagus nerve (CN X). Sometimes, different parts of the muscle (such as the medial and lateral muscle bellies) are supplied by separate branches. This may vary between 1 and 6 branches, usually 2 or 3. These may connect within the muscle.

Function 
The posterior cricoarytenoid muscles are the only muscles to open the vocal cords. By rotating the arytenoid cartilages laterally, these muscles abduct the vocal cords. This opens the rima glottidis.  This is important in breathing and speech. Their action opposes the lateral cricoarytenoid muscles.

Clinical significance 
Paralysis of the posterior cricoarytenoid muscles may lead to asphyxia, as they are the only laryngeal muscles to open the vocal cords (allowing breathing). Denervation leads to a slow fibrosis that worsens over many months.

Additional images

See also 

 Recurrent laryngeal nerve

References

External links 
 
 

Muscles of the head and neck